Jawahar Navodaya Vidyalaya, Idukki or locally known as JNV Kulamavu is a boarding, co-educational school in Idukki district of Kerala state in India. Navodaya Vidyalayas are funded by the Indian Ministry of Human Resources Development and administered  by Navodaya Vidyalaya Samiti, an autonomous body under the ministry.

Geographic location
JNV Kulamavu is located about 1.5 km away from Kulamavu Dam, overlooking the dam reservoir. Idukki district headquarter Painavu is at a distance of about 24 km away from this Navodaya school. JNV Idukki is located in Kerala State Highway 33.

History 
The school was established in 1986 and is a part of Jawahar Navodaya Vidyalaya schools. This school's permanent campus is located in village Kulamavu, Idukki district. This school is administered and monitored by Hyderabad regional office of Navodaya Vidyalaya Smiti.

Admission 
Admission to JNV Idukki at class VI level is made through a selection test conducted by Navodaya Vidyalaya Samiti. The information about the test is disseminated and advertised in the district by the office of Idukki district magistrate (Collector), who is also the chairperson of the Vidyalya Management Committee.

Affiliations 
JNV Idukki is affiliated to Central Board of Secondary Education with affiliation number 940007, following the curriculum prescribed by CBSE.

See also 

 List of JNV schools
 List of Kendriya Vidyalayas
 Odisha Adarsha Vidyalaya - Emulation of the Navodaya Vidyalaya system

References

External links 

 Official Website of JNV Idukki

High schools and secondary schools in Kerala
Idukki
Educational institutions established in 1986
1986 establishments in Kerala
Idukki district